E. Wragg & Son  was a pipe organ builder based in Nottingham that flourished between 1894 and 1969.

Background
Ernest Wragg of Carlton trained with Charles Lloyd in Nottingham and set up as an organ builder himself in 1894 on Carlton Road, Thorneywood. Later the company changed its name when Wragg's son, J. E. Fenton, joined the business as E. Wragg & Son, Organ Builders, and it is under this name that most of the company work is known today.

Ernest Wragg died on 27 March 1949.

Despite Nottingham having at least seven organ builders in the 19th and 20h centuries, E. Wragg and Son were responsible for organs in a large percentage of the churches in the Nottingham area.

The company was acquired by Henry Groves & Son in 1969.

List of works
St. Matthias' Church, Nottingham 1912
St Faith's Church, Nottingham
St. Paul's Church, Carlton-in-the-Willows
St Alban's Church, Sneinton 1916 
St Christopher's Church, Bare 1934 
St. Cyprian's Church, Sneinton 1935
Lenton Methodist Church 1939 (relocation)
Church of St Mary the Virgin, Plumtree (refurbish) 1959
Church of St Mary and All Saints, Willoughby-on-the-Wolds
St. Werburgh, Blackwell, Bolsover, rebuild 1967

References

Pipe organ building companies
Organ builders of the United Kingdom
Manufacturing companies established in 1894
British companies established in 1894
Manufacturing companies based in Nottingham
Musical instrument manufacturing companies of the United Kingdom